Emma Ferguson is a British actress.  She is best known for her starring role in the series Mile High and appearances in North and South and The Brides in the Bath.

Early life
Emma Ferguson is from Wandsworth, London. She travelled regularly from a young age, living in countries such as Hong Kong, Germany and The UAE (in  Dubai). During this time, she studied at military schools and learned three languages.

Career
On screen, Ferguson has appeared in TV commercials (particularly hair product advertising) and various television programmes including Doctors, The Bill and Mile High. She also provided the voice acting for the character Jessica in the English language version of the PlayStation 2 game Dragon Quest VIII.

In the theatre, Ferguson has appeared as Countess Florence/Antonescu in Terence Rattigan's Man and Boy'''s 2004 tour and West End run, directed by Maria Aitken; as Constanza, in the London Symphonia's 2003 production of Amadeus, directed by Jonathan Best; and as Isabelle in a 2000 production of Ring Round the Moon, at the King's Head Theatre, directed by Phil Willmott.

Ferguson starred in Mile High'' as Emma Coyle, alongside Adam Sinclair, James W. Redmond, Jo Anne Knowles, Matthew Chambers, Naomi Ryan, Sarah Manners and Tom Wisdom.

Personal life
In 2006, Ferguson became engaged to her boyfriend, Take That singer Mark Owen, with whom she had been in a relationship since 2004. On 8 November 2009, the pair married in Cawdor Church, Scotland. In 2010, the couple separated after Owen publicly admitted to a drinking problem and having multiple affairs throughout their courtship. They reconciled after he went to rehab and completed his treatment. In 2021, after living there for a couple of years, Ferguson and her family decided to relocate permanently to the United States of America.

Acting credits

References

External links

British television actresses
British voice actresses
British soap opera actresses
Living people
Year of birth missing (living people)